Refined Printing Command Stream, also known as RPCS, is a vector-based printing/duplicating control protocol, designed for communication between Microsoft Windows PC clients, and several lines of Ricoh copiers.  Drivers provided by Ricoh install the chosen copier to behave as a printer device.

The size-efficiency of the protocol is comparable to PCL6.

Drivers
Ricoh offers RPCS based drivers for Windows, Mac OS and to some extent for Linux.

Linux
Drivers for Linux are provided only on the Japanese website. Instead of Aficio they are called IPSiO.

See also
Ricoh Hong Kong
PCL - Printer Command Language, a printer control protocol family designed by Hewlett-Packard

References

Further reading
A tutorial about installing the Ricoh RPCS driver on Linux

Page description languages